The  Sri Lankan Ambassador to France is the Sri Lankan envoy to France. The Sri Lankan Ambassador to France is concurrently accredited as Ambassador to Portugal and Spain. The current ambassador is HE Tilak Ranaviraja

Ambassadors
 Sir Lalitha Rajapakse
 Fredrick de Silva
 Tissa Wijeyeratne
 Vernon Mendis
 N. Balasubramaniam
 Ediriweera Sarachchandra
 Ananda Goonesekera
 Senake Bandaranayake
 Ananda W. P. Guruge
 Warnasena Rasaputra
 Sumitra Peries
 C. G. Wickremasinghe
 Ananda Goonathilake 
 Chitranganee Wagiswara 
 Lionel Fernando
 Dayan Jayatilleka
 Karu Hangawatte
 Tilak Ranaviraja
 Buddhi Athauda
 Kshanika Hirimburegama (designate)

See also
List of heads of missions from Sri Lanka

References

External links
 Embassy of Sri Lanka, Paris

Sri Lanka
France